Laurence Jeanne Arnoldine Joseph Stassen (born 8 February 1971, in Sittard) is an independent Dutch politician and a former freelance television presenter of the regional broadcasting TV Limburg. There she presented the program sponsored Limburg Leeft (translated: Limburg Lives) about residency and life in Limburg.

In the 2009 European Parliament elections, Stassen was ranked as fourth on the Party for Freedom (PVV) list. The PVV won four seats, but the lower-ranked party leader Geert Wilders was elected by preference votes. Wilders, however, had already declared that he would remain in the House of Representatives of the Netherlands and not take up his seat in the European Parliament, thus Stassen became a Member of the European Parliament on 14 July 2009.

On 10 December 2010, it was announced that Stassen would run for PVV party leader in the province of Limburg in the 2011 provincial elections. She was so elected and retained her membership of the European Parliament. On 21 March 2014, she left the PVV after allegedly discriminatory remarks by Geert Wilders about Moroccans. She stayed on until the European Parliament elections in May 2014, but immediately left the States-Provincial in Limburg, returning her seat to the Party for Freedom.

Stassen then stood in the 2014 European elections for the constituency of South East England in the UK as the number one candidate for the Eurosceptic party An Independence from Europe. She was not elected.

In December 2014, Stassen announced that she had joined the party For the Netherlands, which had been founded by two fellow former PVV members earlier that year.

Laurence Stassen is married with two children. She lives in Echt.

References

External links
 L.J.A.J. (Laurence) Stassen at www.parlement.com

1971 births
Living people
Dutch television presenters
VoorNederland politicians
Independent politicians in the Netherlands
Members of the Provincial Council of Limburg
MEPs for the Netherlands 2009–2014
21st-century women MEPs for the Netherlands
Party for Freedom MEPs
Party for Freedom politicians
People from Echt-Susteren
People from Sittard
21st-century Dutch politicians
Dutch women television presenters